Kulichenko or Kulychenko (Куличенко) is a Ukrainian surname. Notable people with the surname include:

 Ivan Kulichenko (born 1955), Ukrainian politician
 Sergei Kulichenko (born 1978), Russian footballer

See also
 

Ukrainian-language surnames